Hong Kong has submitted 37 films for the Academy Award for Best International Feature Film since first entering the Oscar competition in 1959. The award is handed out annually by the United States Academy of Motion Picture Arts and Sciences to a feature-length motion picture produced outside the United States that contains primarily non-English dialogue. Hong Kong's submission is decided annually by Hong Kong's Motion Picture Industry Association.

Hong Kong, China, and Taiwan are recognized as separate entities by AMPAS and each one routinely sends a film to the competition. To date, three Hong Kong submissions have obtained nominations: 1991's Raise the Red Lantern, 1993's Farewell My Concubine, and 2019's Better Days. The first two were directed by Mainland-directors, with Better Days as the only nominee directed by a Hong Kong native. Although one of the hallmarks of Hong Kong Cinema has been its use of the distinctive Cantonese language, less than half of Hong Kong's Oscar submissions have been in Cantonese. Although the American 2006 film The Departed won the Academy Award for Best Picture, the 2002 Hong Kong film it was based on, Infernal Affairs, did not receive any Academy Award nominations.

Johnnie To and Li Han-hsiang have had their films selected three times while Yueh Feng, Wai Ka-fai, King Hu, Ann Hui and Yim Ho have each been selected twice. In both 2002 and 2004, Hong Kong's submissions were rejected by the Academy for not conforming to AMPAS rules.

Submissions
Every year, each country is invited by the Academy of Motion Picture Arts and Sciences to submit its best film for the Academy Award for Best Foreign Language Film. The Foreign Language Film Award Committee oversees the process and reviews all the submitted films. Following this, they vote via secret ballot to determine the five nominees for the award. Below is a list of the films that have been submitted by Hong Kong for review by the Academy for the award.

Hong Kong's submissions have included a large number of films set in Mainland China, including several lavish period costume dramas (1966, 1976, 1991, 2000 and 2006), two tales set against the background of the Peking Opera scene (1989 and 1993) as well as more intimate stories of rural China (1969, 1979, 1984 and 1994). They have also selected one story about the traditional Cantonese opera scene in Hong Kong (1996), three gritty triad dramas focusing on Hong Kong's criminal underworld (2001, 2003, 2007), two melodramas (1959, 1964), two contemporary family dramas (1995 and 1998), stories focusing on immigration to and from Hong Kong (1990 and 1999), a number of supernatural thrillers (1960, 2002, 2004, 2008), and two big-budget musicals (1963, 2005). In 2009, they chose a historical drama set in neighboring Taiwan for the first time.

See also
List of Academy Award winners and nominees for Best Foreign Language Film
List of Academy Award-winning foreign language films
Cinema of Hong Kong
List of Chinese submissions for the Academy Award for Best International Feature Film
List of Taiwanese submissions for the Academy Award for Best International Feature Film

Notes

References
General

Specific

External links
The Official Academy Awards Database
The Motion Picture Credits Database
IMDb Academy Awards Page

Hong Kong
Academy Award for Best Foreign Language Film